Blažim may refer to any of these places in the Czech Republic:

Blažim (Louny District), a village in the Ústí nad Labem Region
Blažim (Plzeň-North District), a village in the Plzeň Region